Pallikkal (Pallikkal Bazar)  is a T-shaped town, village and gram panchayat in Kondotty Taluk, Malappuram district in the state of Kerala, India.

Calicut International Airport at Karipur is near Pallikkal.

Pallikkal Bazar is with in  5 km from the University of Calicut and from Kondotty.

Kerala’s first Akshaya center was started in Pallikal gram panchayat. AMLP School Pallikkal is in Pallikkal Bazar.

Proposed Karipur-Kondotty Municipality 
The proposed Karipur-Kondotty Municipality comprises
Kondotty panchayat (villages of Kondotty, and part of Karipur)
Nediyiruppu panchayat (villages of Nediyiruppu, and part of Karipur)
Pallikkal panchayat (villages of Pallikkal, and part of Karipur)
Pulikkal panchayat
Cherukavu panchayat
Vazhayur panchayat

Total Area: 122.99 km2

Total Population (1991 Census): 152,839

Demographics
 India census, Pallikkal had a population of 38166 with 18945 males and 19221 females.

Landmarks
 Marketile Shihabikka
 Dragon kung fu dojo
 V mark supermarket
 Rasack building
 Pallikkal Bazar Masjid
 Shri Maha Ganapathy Temple
 AMUP School
 VPKMHS School

Suburbs and villages
 UKC, Kavumpadi
 Devathiyal, Puthur-Palikkal and Thottiyil
 Paruthikkode and Arakkott
 Kozhippuram, Pallikkal and College Road
 Koonulmad and Alparamb
 Karippur and Kumminiparamb

Transportation

Calicut International Airport is located in Pallikkal panchayath and is situated around 7 kms away from Pallikkal Bazar town.

The nearest railway stations are at Feroke, Parappanangadi and Vallikunnu. The nearest major railway station at Kozhikode is 20 kms away.

Pallikkal Bazar town and surrounding areas are also well connected by road and local bus transportation systems. National Highway 66 and National Highway 966 are 2.5 kms and 3 kms away respectively from Pallikkal Bazar. The town itself is located on Kakkanchery-Kottapuram road which is a major throughfare and also a major link between NH-66 and NH-966.

Gallery

References

Cities and towns in Malappuram district
Parappanangadi area